Courtenay Sprunger is an American politician and public relations executive, serving in the Montana House of Representatives for District 7 since 2023. A member of the Republican Party, Sprunger is the owner of Big Sky Public Relations in Kalispell. She was elected in 2022, after defeating Democratic nominee Angela Kennedy in the general election.

References

External links 
Ballotpedia page
Campaign website

1981 births
Living people
Politicians from Kalispell, Montana
Republican Party members of the Montana House of Representatives
American women chief executives